Norsky is a Ro-Ro cargo ferry owned by Bore and operated by P&O Ferries with sister ship MS Norstream on the Tilbury-Zeebrugge route.

History
Norsky was built by Aker Finyards in Rauma, Finland. She was laid down on 4 September 1998, launched on 26 March 1999 and completed on 29 June 1999.

References

Ships of P&O Ferries
1999 ships